Óscar Ortiz (born May 9, 1973, in Mexico City) is a former tennis player from Mexico, who turned professional in 1991. The left-hander represented his native country at the 1996 Summer Olympics in Atlanta, Georgia, where he was defeated in the second round. Ortiz reached his highest singles ATP-ranking on May 29, 1995, when he became the number 141 of the world and became # 1 player in Mexico He won the silver medal at the Pan American Games

Reach number 122 in the ATP in doubles in June 1996.
Panamerican Games Captain in Santo Domingo, Dominican Republic 2003 and Rio de Janeiro Brasil 2007
Federation Cup Captain from Mexico 2005 to 2008
Mexican Davis Cup Captain 2006 to 2008.

ATP Challenger and ITF Futures finals

Singles: 2 (2–0)

Doubles: 17 (8–9)

Performance timeline

Singles

External links
 
 
 

Federation Cup Captain from 2005 to 2008
Davis Cup Captain from Mexico 2006 to 2008

1973 births
Living people
Mexican male tennis players
Olympic tennis players of Mexico
Tennis players from Mexico City
Tennis players at the 1996 Summer Olympics
Tennis players at the 1999 Pan American Games
Pan American Games silver medalists for Mexico
Pan American Games medalists in tennis
Medalists at the 1999 Pan American Games